Paranastella is a genus of beetles in the family Buprestidae, containing the following species:

 Paranastella strandi Obenberger, 1931
 Paranastella villiersi Descarpentries, 1984
 Paranastella viridis Bellamy, 2006

References

Buprestidae genera